Albert Bowers was an English professional rugby league footballer who played in the 1930s and 1940s.

International honours
Albert Bowers won caps for England while at Hull in 1947 against Wales (2 matches).

References

External links
 (archived by web.archive.org) Stats → Past Players → B
 (archived by web.archive.org) Statistics at hullfc.com

England national rugby league team players
English rugby league players
Hull F.C. players
Place of death missing
Place of birth missing
Rugby league wingers
Year of birth missing
Year of death missing